The 1998 Canadian Figure Skating Championships were held on January 7–11, 1998 in Hamilton, Ontario. They were the figure skating national championship which determines the national champions of Canada. The event was organized by Skate Canada, the nation's figure skating governing body. Skaters competed at the senior, junior, and novice levels in the disciplines of men's singles, ladies' singles, pair skating, and ice dancing. The results of this competition were used to pick the Canadian teams to the 1998 Winter Olympics and 1998 World Championships.

Senior results

Men

Ladies

Pairs

Ice dancing

Junior results

Men

Ladies

Pairs

Ice dancing

Novice results

Men

Ladies

Pairs

Ice dancing

External links
 1998 Bank of Montreal Canadian Championships

Canadian Figure Skating Championships
Figure skating
Canadian Figure Skating Championships
Sports competitions in Hamilton, Ontario
sports
20th century in Hamilton, Ontario
January 1998 sports events in Canada